The discography of Australian singer-songwriter Orianthi consists of five studio albums, six singles, ten music videos, a re-issue, an extended play, and 21 other collaborations. Her second studio album, Believe, was certified gold by the Recording Industry Association of Japan (RIAJ) in 2010.

Albums

Studio albums

Live albums

Re-issues

Compilation albums

Extended plays

Singles

Featured songs

Studio work

Songs in other media

Music videos

References

External links

 
 
Discographies of Australian artists